C/2013 R1 (Lovejoy) is a long-period comet discovered on 7 September 2013 by Terry Lovejoy using a  Schmidt–Cassegrain telescope. It is the fourth comet discovered by Terry Lovejoy. C/2013 R1 crossed the celestial equator on 14 October 2013, becoming a better Northern Hemisphere object.

History
By 1 November 2013, the comet was visible to the naked eye near the Beehive Cluster (M44), about halfway between Jupiter and Regulus. It became more impressive than comet ISON. In binoculars, the comet has the appearance of a green, unresolved globular cluster.

On 27 November 2013 the comet was in the constellation of Canes Venatici, near the bottom of the handle of the Big Dipper. From 28 November until 4 December 2013, the comet was in the constellation Boötes. On 1 December 2013 it passed the star Beta Boötis. From 4 December until 12 December 2013, the comet was in the constellation Corona Borealis.

From 12 December until 14 January 2014, the comet was in the constellation Hercules. On 14 December 2013, it passed the star Zeta Herculis. At perihelion, the comet had an elongation of 51 degrees from the Sun. By September 2014, the comet had fainted to magnitude 18.

References

External links 

Elements and Ephemeris for C/2013 R1 (Lovejoy) – Minor Planet Center
Comet Lovejoy Over a Windmill (APOD : 9 December 2013)

2013R01
20131222
201401

20130907